Golabundan may refer to:
 Golabundan-e Olya
 Golabundan-e Sofla